Betton may refer to:

Places

 Betton, Ille-et-Vilaine, France
 Betton, Shropshire, England
 Betton-Bettonet, Savoie, France
 Betton Strange, Shropshire, England

People
 Betton, Count of Tonnerre, a sixth-century member of the royal house of the Kingdom of Burgundy
 Arnold Betton (born 1932), American high jumper
 Silas Betton, American lawyer, sheriff and politician